"In a Big Country" is a song by Scottish rock band Big Country. It was released in May 1983 as the third single from their debut studio album The Crossing. The song reached No. 17 on the UK Singles Chart in June 1983. It was released in the US in the autumn of 1983 and peaked at No. 3 on the Top Rock Tracks chart and No. 17 on the Billboard Hot 100 in December of that year. It reached No. 3 on the RPM Top Singles Chart in Canada on 26 November 1983.

Music video
The music video for the song received heavy airplay on MTV. Directed by Lindsey Clennell, it follows the four band members as they track down an unspecified treasure, while constantly being pursued and bested by a woman who appears to be a rival treasure-hunter.

The first half of the video follows the band as they ride through lush green fields on sports three-wheelers and a motorbike while the woman watches them through binoculars. The group soon locates a black box emblazoned with the band's logo and a map. What is inside the box is never shown. The opening scenes are filmed at the then-derelict Corfe Castle railway station including the 'down' platform shelter and show the ruins of Corfe Castle in the background. The station is now part of the restored Swanage Railway.

The woman lures them to her by starting a fire in a barn, the smoke drawing the band members' attention. She (unintentionally and comically) defeats all four with a single punch. They then consult their map and head off again.

The second half of the video takes place at sea in Swanage Bay. The band head towards Swanage Pier where they don wet suits and scuba gear and set out on a motorized inflatable raft. The woman, who has followed them, overtakes them on a jet ski. The band reach their destination at sea, but have apparently no luck in locating the treasure after attempting some underwater diving (however, since nobody in the band was actually scuba certified, this meant having to stay on the surface).

The video concludes with the woman trapped on a small island surrounded by a cliff with a rescue fire burning. The band appears overhead and lead singer Stuart Adamson tosses a rope down the cliff edge. He and drummer Mark descend. Stuart and the woman embrace (perhaps revealing they knew each other and had an ongoing relationship/rivalry) while Mark discovers the black box floating amongst the seaweed in the inlet.

Interspersed throughout the video, in between the action, the band is shown in flannel shirts and blazers performing the song onstage. The video ends on this note, with Stuart dancing and the rest of the band playing.

Reception
The Smashing Pumpkins' James Iha named the song to his "mixtape for dreamers," commenting, "I love this song. I used to watch the video when it was on MTV. When MTV played videos. ... The music is super-anthemic, the guitars are awesome and bagpipe-like, and it's somehow incorporating the band's name, that they're in a big country and then dreams stay with you like a lover's voice. It's sounds like Braveheart or something."

Charts

Weekly charts

Year-end charts

American Authors version

"In a Big Country" was covered by American alternative rock band American Authors. The song was recorded by the band for the 2014 single "In a Big Country / You Make My Dreams Come True", with American alternative rock band The Mowgli's. The single was released by Island Def Jam on vinyl on 19 April 2014 as a Record Store Day release. The track appeared as the A-side of the single. It charted on Billboard in 2014–2015.

Track listing

Personnel
American Authors
 Zac Barnett – lead vocals, guitar
 James Adam Shelley – lead guitar, banjo
 Dave Rublin – bass
 Matt Sanchez – drums

Release history

References

1983 songs
1983 singles
Big Country songs
Song recordings produced by Steve Lillywhite
Songs written by Stuart Adamson
Songs written by Mark Brzezicki
Songs written by Tony Butler (musician)
Songs written by Bruce Watson (guitarist)
Mercury Records singles
Island Records singles